2016 Kashiwa Reysol season.

J1 League

References

External links
 J.League official site

Kashiwa Reysol
Kashiwa Reysol seasons